IRAS 17423-1755 also known as Henize 3-1475 is a planetary nebula, located in the constellation of Sagittarius around 18,000 light-years away from earth. The central star is around 20,000 times as luminous as the Sun.

References

Planetary nebulae
Sagittarius (constellation)